Florenc Central Bus Station (also known as Prague main bus terminal (Florenc) or Main bus station (Florenc)) is the largest and most well-known bus terminal both in Prague and the Czech Republic. It is located eastward of the part of the city with the same name, Florenc, the top part of the terminal belongs to city quarter New Town, whereas the bottom part and the building with the old hall belongs to the cadastral area Karlín in Prague 8. The old hall with the former main entrance is located in the Křížikova street next to the Musical Theatre Karlín, the entrance for the buses is from the crossroads of streets Prvního pluku and Malého.

Between the years 1992 and 2004, the name of the bus terminal was also in the name of the joint-stock company that owned the bus terminal.

The terminal sees 10 000 000 travellers yearly. It is located above the Prague metro station of the same name.

References 

Public transport in Prague
Bus stations in Europe